Sinnam station is a railroad station in South Korea.

 Old name of Gimyujeong station
 Old name of Cheongnaeondeok station